Buried is a British television prison drama, produced by World Productions for Channel 4 and originally broadcast between 14 January and 4 March 2003. The eight-part series starred Lennie James, Stephen Walters, Connor McIntyre, Jane Hazlegrove, and Neil Bell in key roles.

Plot
The lives of the prisoners and guards are intertwined within D Wing of Her Majesty's Prison (HMP) Mandrake Hill, a category B prison in the North of England. Lee Kingley (Lenny James), a first time prisoner and previously upstanding family man, is sentenced to serve ten years for Grievous Bodily Harm (GBH) and a firearm offense for defending his sister from her rapist. Respected by the other inmates due to the nature of his crime, Kingsley soon rises to the top of the prison hierarchy alongside his brother and hardened criminal Troy (Dave Fishley). With his mental health in question, Troy is soon transferred to a maximum security prison, leaving Kingsley in charge of a drug and money-lending business with fellow inmate Kappa Kid (James Wells). Disturbed by this development and the news that his wife will not be visiting with his daughter as expected, Kingsley begins to believe the rumors circulating about Kappa. Unsure whom to trust and haunted by his experiences, life for Kingsley becomes one altercation after another.

Prison psychologist Dr. Nick Vaughan (Stephen Walters) runs the Drug Free Unit (DFU) of the prison, working with the prisoners on a one-on-one and group basis. When Officer Deidre Burridge (Jane Hazelgrove) is referred to him by her superior, Officer Martin Steddon (Conor McIntyre), in lieu of disciplinary action for striking a prisoner, the two begin a sexual relationship. Revealing themselves both emotionally and physically ends in violence and resentment for the couple. Vaughn is discovered to have been involved with a crime as a child, Burrdige was assaulted by men in her past, Officer Dave Stour (Smug Roberts) takes financial advice from a prisoner, and Governor Chris Russo (Neil Fitzmaurice) is more interested in how the prison looks to other officials than its actual state. Their interactions with each other and the prisoners leads to both clashes and a questioning of personal motivations for working within the prison system.

Production
Produced by Tony Garrett's company World Productions, Buried was conceived to give an authentic look at prison life in the UK. The series was co-created by Jimmy Gardner, Robert Jones, and Kath Mattock, who had previously collaborated on the BAFTA Award-winning BBC2 series The Cops. In order to assure authenticity, the series hired Professor David Wilson, a specialist in criminology. Wilson stated that he "...wanted to work with World Productions because [he] knew that they would present prison as it really is."

The series was described by the show's producers as portraying "the strict hierarchy that exists among prisoners, and the unspoken co-operation that allows six officers to govern hundreds of inmates", and how the "prisoners and officers alike are locked in psychological warfare, and that each day is an exercise in survival."

Through the use of lighting, camera angles, and dialogue, the series refrains from making moral judgments on the characters, showing both their strengths and weaknesses. By exploring every aspect of prison life, Buried allowed television views with no direct experience of 'the inside' to view the realities of prison life.

Critically well-received, the programme won the Best Drama Series category at the British Academy Television Awards in 2004. It was suggested midway through the series run that it was unlikely to be recommissioned because of poor ratings. The series averaged just a million viewers and an 8% audience share in its Tuesday night slot of 10:35 pm. A Channel 4 spokesperson said: "It's a good piece of drama, but the audiences haven't been as good as the critical response".

Cast

Inmates

 Lennie James as Lee Kingley
 Dean Andrews as Barry Sheil
 Francis Magee as Felix 'Ronaldo' Carver
 Johann Myers as Martin Wellcome 
 Steve Evets as Peter 'Pele' Pelly 
 Dave Fishley as Troy Kingley
 Sean Cernow as Kirk Mitchell
 Andrew Lee Potts as Henry Curtis
 Daniel Lestuzzi as Croppa 'Kid' Sims
 Joseph Kpobie as Hector French
 Bill Rodgers as John Gossie 
 Anthony Flanagan as Ralph Collitt
 Mark Womack as Ronnie Keach
 Ricci Harnett as Alan Veeder
 Robbie Gee as Brewster Woolnough
 James Wells as Kappa
 Shahid Ahmed as Kamid
 Saqib Mumtaz as Omar
 Merrick Hayward as Patty
 Michael Imerson as Breezy 
 Danny Nussbaum as Tammy 
 Gary Cargill as Blake 
 Liam Barr as Lucas
 Paul Brennen as Dolly
 James Foster as Ryan
 Steve Ramsden as Carter
 Adrian Hood as Birdman
 Sean McKee as Rollieman

Prison Staff

 Stephen Walters as Dr. Nick Vaughan
 Connor McIntyre as Officer Martin Steddon
 Jane Hazlegrove as Officer Deidre 'DD' Burridge
 Neil Bell as Officer Slacker Courtenay
 Smug Roberts as Officer David Stour 
 Neil Fitzmaurice as Governor Chris Russo

Episodes

Releases

In 2016, the complete series was released as a box-set on All4 and is available to watch on demand. Buried was released on DVD in 2018 by Simply Media.

References

External links
Buried at Channel4.com
Buried at World Productions
Buried at the British Film Institute

Channel 4 television dramas
2000s British drama television series
2003 British television series debuts
2003 British television series endings
Television series by World Productions